Seneca County is located in the U.S. state of New York. As of the 2020 census, the population was 33,814. The primary county seat is Waterloo, moved there from the original county seat of Ovid in 1819. It became a two-shire county in 1822, which currently remains in effect and uses both locations as county seats although the majority of Seneca County administrative offices are located in Waterloo. Therefore, most political sources list only Waterloo as the county seat. The county's name comes from the Seneca Nation of the Haudenosaunee (Iroquois), who occupied part of the region.

Seneca County comprises the Seneca Falls, NY Micropolitan Statistical Area, which is also included in the Rochester-Batavia-Seneca Falls, NY Combined Statistical Area.

History
The area covered by Seneca County straddles the prehistoric territories of both Seneca and Cayuga Nations of the Haudenosaunee.  When counties were established by Europeans in New York in 1683, the present-day Seneca County was part of Albany County. This was an enormous county, including the northern part of New York as well as all of the present state of Vermont and, in theory, extending westward to the Pacific Ocean. This county was reduced in size on July 3, 1766, by the creation of Cumberland County, and further on March 16, 1770, by the creation of Gloucester County, both containing territory now in Vermont.

On March 12, 1772, what was left of Albany County was split into three parts, one remaining under the name Albany County. One of the other pieces, Tryon County, contained the western portion (and thus, since no western boundary was specified, theoretically still extended west to the Pacific). The eastern boundary of Tryon County was approximately five miles west of the present city of Schenectady, and the county included the western part of the Adirondack Mountains and the area west of the West Branch of the Delaware River. The area then designated as Tryon County now includes 37 counties of New York State. The county was named for William Tryon, colonial governor of New York.

In the years prior to 1776, most of the Loyalists in Tryon County fled to Canada. In the fall of 1779 on orders from commander-in-chief General George Washington the Sullivan Expedition conducted a scorched earth campaign against the Iroquois who sided with the Loyalists in the Revolutionary War.  Sullivan's path destroyed Cayuga and Seneca villages along the east shore of Seneca Lake.

In 1784, following the peace treaty that ended the American Revolutionary War, the name of Tryon County was changed to Montgomery County in honor of the general, Richard Montgomery, who had captured several places in Canada and died attempting to capture the city of Quebec, replacing the name of the hated British governor.

In 1789, Montgomery County was reduced in size by the splitting off of Ontario County. The actual area split off from Montgomery County was much larger than the present Ontario County, also including the present Allegany, Cattaraugus, Chautauqua, Erie, Genesee, Livingston, Monroe, Niagara, Orleans, Steuben, Wyoming, Yates, and parts of Schuyler and Wayne counties.

Herkimer County was one of three counties split off from Montgomery County (the others being Otsego and Tioga counties) in 1791.

Onondaga County was formed in 1794 by the splitting of Herkimer County.

Cayuga County was formed in 1799 by the splitting of Onondaga County. This county was, however, much larger than the present Cayuga County. It then included the present Seneca and Tompkins counties and part of Wayne County.

In 1804, Seneca County was formed by the splitting of Cayuga County.

In 1817, Seneca County was reduced in size by combining portions of Seneca and the remainder of Cayuga County to form Tompkins County.  Part of this territory, the current towns of Covert and Lodi, were returned to Seneca County in 1819.

The original county seat of Seneca County was located in Ovid, where a court house was constructed in 1806.  After southern portions of the county were removed in 1817 to become part of Tompkins County, the seat was moved to Waterloo as the village was more geographically centered at the time. In 1823, northern portions of the county were removed to form part of Wayne County. This put Waterloo in the same situation as Ovid with being on one end of Seneca County. A compromise was made to use both locations as county seats, becoming a two-shire county. It included the constitution of two county courts and jury districts under Chapter 137 of the New York State Laws of 1822. In 1895, the Seneca County Board of Supervisors voted to abolish the setup of two jury districts. It later voted to remove the two-shire county system in 1921, making Waterloo the only county seat, but was reinstated two years later.  At least once a year, the County Board of Supervisors holds its monthly meeting in Ovid to maintain the two-shire status.

In 1823, Seneca County was reduced in size by combining portions of Seneca and Ontario counties to form Wayne County.

Geography

Seneca County is in the western part of New York in the Finger Lakes Region, bounded on the east by Cayuga Lake and on the west by Seneca Lake.

The Finger Lakes National Forest is in the south part of the county.

Both the New York State Thruway and the Erie Canal cross the northern part of the county.

The former Seneca Army Depot occupies a portion of land between Cayuga and Seneca Lakes.  The former Willard Drug Treatment Center and Five Points Correctional Facility are two New York State prisons located in the county.  Sampson State Park is located next to the former Army base.

Adjacent counties
 Wayne County - north
 Cayuga County - east
 Tompkins County - southeast
 Schuyler County - south
 Yates County - southwest
 Ontario County - west

Major highways
   Interstate 90 (New York State Thruway)
  U.S. Route 20
  New York State Route 5
  New York State Route 89
  New York State Route 96
  New York State Route 96A
  New York State Route 414
  New York State Route 336

National protected areas
 Finger Lakes National Forest (part)
 Montezuma National Wildlife Refuge (part)
 Women's Rights National Historical Park

Demographics

As of the census of 2010, there were 35,251 people, 13,393 households, and 8,762 families residing in the county.  The population density was 103 people per square mile (40/km2).  There were 14,794 housing units at an average density of 46 per square mile (18/km2).  The racial makeup of the county was  93.7% White, 5.1% African American, 0.8% Native American, 0.8% Asian, 0.01% Pacific Islander, 0.9% from other races, and 1.3% from two or more races. Hispanic or Latino of any race were 2.7% of the population. 18.9% were of Italian, 16.7% German, 14.6% English, 13.4% Irish and 8.9% American ancestry according to Census 2000. 95.3% spoke English and 1.6% Spanish as their first language.

There were 12,630 households, out of which 31.90% had children under the age of 18 living with them, 53.60% were married couples living together, 10.30% had a female householder with no husband present, and 31.70% were non-families. 25.30% of all households were made up of individuals, and 11.60% had someone living alone who was 65 years of age or older.  The average household size was 2.51 and the average family size was 2.99.

In the county, the population was spread out, with 24.80% under the age of 18, 7.50% from 18 to 24, 28.80% from 25 to 44, 23.80% from 45 to 64, and 15.10% who were 65 years of age or older.  The median age was 38 years. For every 100 females there were 100.10 males.  For every 100 females age 18 and over, there were 99.50 males.

The median income for a household in the county was $37,140, and the median income for a family was $45,445. Males had a median income of $32,512 versus $24,320 for females. The per capita income for the county was $17,630.  About 8.00% of families and 11.50% of the population were below the poverty line, including 14.80% of those under age 18 and 7.30% of those age 65 or over.

2020 Census

Government and politics

|}

The county is governed by a fourteen-member Board of Supervisors, composed of the town supervisor representing each of the ten townships in Seneca County along with four additional at-large members from the towns of Waterloo and Seneca Falls (two per township). The board normally meets every 2nd Tuesday of the month at the Seneca County Office Building in Waterloo with at least one meeting per year held at the old Seneca County Courthouse Complex in Ovid as honor of the two-shire system.  Each supervisor has a weighted vote based on the population of the town they represent.

Historically a Republican-voting county, Seneca has become more competitive in recent years and is now a swing county in Presidential elections. With the exception of 2000 and 2020, when Al Gore and Donald Trump, respectively, carried the county, voters here have opted for the winner of every Presidential election since 1980.

Communities

Larger Settlements

† - County Seat

Towns

 Covert
 Fayette
 Junius
 Lodi
 Ovid
 Romulus
 Seneca Falls
 Tyre
 Varick
 Waterloo

Hamlets
Seneca county has a number of unincorporated communities. Most are considered hamlets.
 Border City
 Bridgeport
 Canoga
 Caywood
 Covert
 Dobbins Corner
 Dublin
 East Geneva
 East Varick
 Fayette
 Kendaia
 MacDougall
 Magee
 Malcom
 Mays Point
 Townsendville
 Tyre
 Varick
 Willard

See also

 List of counties in New York
 National Register of Historic Places listings in Seneca County, New York
 List of county routes in Seneca County, New York

References

Further reading

External links
 Official Seneca County, New York site
 
 Seneca County Historical Aerial Photographs of New York , Cornell University Library & Cornell Institute for Resource Information Sciences

 
1804 establishments in New York (state)
Populated places established in 1804
New York placenames of Native American origin